Parnassius nandadevinensis  is a high-altitude butterfly which is found only on Mt Nanda Devi, India. It is a member of the snow Apollo genus (Parnassius) of the swallowtail family (Papilionidae). It was described on the basis of a single worn specimen. The genitalia are said to be intermediate in structure between P. acdestis and P. stoliczkanus and could possibly represent an aberrant specimen of either.

References

nandadevinensis
Butterflies of Asia
Butterflies described in 1990